Muhammad Hanif Dhakiri (born 6 June 1972) is an Indonesian politician. He is the Minister of Manpower in the Working Cabinet. He was a member of the People's Representative Council of Indonesia from 2009 to 2014 appointed through the National Awakening Party.

References 

1972 births
Living people
People from Semarang
Government ministers of Indonesia